Göksel is a Turkish unisex given name and a surname. Notable people with the name include:

Given name

Female
 Göksel Demirpençe (born 1971), Turkish musician
 Göksel Kortay (born 1939), Turkish actress

Male
 Göksel Arsoy (born 1936), Turkish actor, singer, and sportsman
 Göksel Gümüşdağ (born 1972), Turkish businessman

Surname
Hüsnü A. Göksel (1919–2002), Turkish physician

Turkish unisex given names
Surnames of Turkish origin